Fotbal Club Dinamo București is a Romanian professional football club based in Bucharest.

Total statistics 

As of August 3, 2017.

Statistics by country
As of 3 August 2017.

Statistics by competition

UEFA Champions League / European Cup

UEFA Cup Winners' Cup / European Cup Winners' Cup

UEFA Europa League / UEFA Cup
Including away match with Athletic Bilbao.

UEFA Intertoto Cup

External links
 Official website

Euro
Romanian football clubs in international competitions